A Kingdom He Likes is the 39th release by avant-folk/blues singer/songwriter Jandek, released by his own Corwood Industries label (#0777). It was his fourth release of 2004 and features the artist on acoustic guitar.

Track listing

References

Jandek albums
2004 albums
Corwood Industries albums